Ramah may refer to:

In ancient Israel
 Ramathaim-Zophim, the birthplace of Samuel
 Ramoth-Gilead, a Levite city of refuge
 Ramah in Benjamin, mentioned in the Book of Jeremiah and also in the Gospel of Matthew
 Baalath-Beer, also known as Ramoth of the South, in the tribe of Simeon
 a city of Asher, which seems to be difficult to identify. Some have believed it to be the same as Rameh, southeast of Tyre
 a city in Naphtali's territory. It may be the same as Khirbet Zeitun er-Rameh east of today's Rameh village

Others
Camp Ramah, a number of Jewish summer camps affiliated with the Conservative Movement of Judaism
Ramah, the Hebrew acronym of Rabbi Meir Abulafia
Ramah Navajo Indian Reservation, New Mexico
Ramah, New Mexico, a town in the  U.S. state of New Mexico
Ramah, Colorado, a town in the U.S. state of Colorado
Ramah, Newfoundland and Labrador, Canada
Ramah, an alternate name used in the Book of Mormon for the hill Cumorah

See also
Rama (disambiguation)
 Ramoth (disambiguation)
 Rameh, on Pierre Jacotin's 1799 map as "Ramah"